Villalobos is a municipality located in the province of Zamora, Castile and León, Spain.

According to the 2004 census (INE), the municipality has a population of 295 inhabitants.

The name literally means "City of Wolves" or "Village of the Wolves". The surname Villalobos originates from this town.

Municipalities of the Province of Zamora